Nikola Grbić (born 6 September 1973) is a Serbian professional volleyball coach and former player, who is currently serving as head coach for the Poland national team. The Olympic Champion Sydney 2000, a bronze medallist in the Olympic Games Atlanta 1996, and a multiple World Championship, European Championship and World League medallist. Grbić was named the European Player of the Year in 2007, and inducted into the Volleyball Hall of Fame in 2016.

Early life
Grbić was born in Klek. He has an older brother Vladimir, who is also a former volleyball player.

Personal life
He is married to Stanislava and has two sons who practice volleyball.

Career as player

Clubs
After the embargo was lifted in 1994, Nikola Yugoslavian national team career resumed at a time when he transferred to Italian club team Gabeca Montichiari, which started a 13–year career playing for eight different Italian teams and resulting in eight league titles from 1994 to 2013.
He won two Championship titles in Italy (2008 Trentino – 2010 Cuneo), and one in Russia (2014 Zenit Kazan). He also won two CEV Euro Champions League titles (2000 Sisley – 2009 Trentino).

National team
He started with senior national team in 1991, when he was 18 years old. Then, for two years (1992–1994) wasn't playing because of international embargo. He was a captain of his national team in 1999–2010. In 1996 Yugoslavia, including Grbić, won bronze medal of the Olympic Games Atlanta 1996. Nikola was honored as the European Championship Best Setter in 1997 as Yugoslavia earned the silver medal. In 1998 Yugoslavia on Volleyball at the World World Championship won a silver medal. At the next Olympics his team achieved gold of the Olympic Games 2000 in Sydney. Yugoslavia went on to capture the 2000 Olympic Games gold-medal with a dominating three-set win over Russia in the finals. They beat Russia in final match (3-0). Again, in 2010, with Serbia his team won a bronze medal. Nikola career was not over following Beijing as he helped Serbia win bronze at the 2010 FIVB World Championship in Italy where he was named Best Setter of the tournament. Nikola career was not over following Beijing as he helped Serbia win bronze at the World Championship.

Career as coach
In May 2014, he became a head coach of Italian club Sir Safety Perugia. On 3 February 2015, Grbić was announced as a new head coach of the Serbia men's national volleyball team. Nikola in his first step winner Silver medal at 2015 FIVB World League. In next year Serbia with powerful presence winner Gold medal 2016 FIVB World League. Serbia had lost their five previous appearances in World League final including three times to Brazil and last year’s against France, now after five silver medals and three bronze, in 2016 year won first Gold medal.

Honours

As a player
 CEV Champions League
  2008/2009 – with Trentino Volley

 CEV European Champions Cup
  1999/2000 – with Sisley Treviso

 CEV Cup
  1997/1998 – with Alpitour Traco Cuneo
  2005/2006 – with Copra Berni Piacenza
  2009/2010 – with Bre Banca Lannutti Cuneo

 National championships
 1991/1992  Serbia and Montenegro Cup, with Vojvodina Novi Sad
 1991/1992  Serbia and Montenegro Championship, with Vojvodina Novi Sad
 1992/1993  Serbia and Montenegro Championship, with Vojvodina Novi Sad
 1993/1994  Serbia and Montenegro Cup, with Vojvodina Novi Sad
 1993/1994  Serbia and Montenegro Championship, with Vojvodina Novi Sad
 1998/1999  Italian Cup, with TNT Alpitour Cuneo
 1999/2000  Italian Cup, with Sisley Treviso
 2007/2008  Italian Championship, with Itas Diatec Trentino
 2009/2010  Italian Championship, with Bre Banca Lannutti Cuneo
 2010/2011  Italian SuperCup, with Bre Banca Lannutti Cuneo
 2010/2011  Italian Cup, with Bre Banca Lannutti Cuneo
 2013/2014  Russian Championship, with Zenit Kazan

As a coach
 CEV Champions League
  2020/2021 – with ZAKSA Kędzierzyn-Koźle

 National championships
 2019/2020  Polish SuperCup, with ZAKSA Kędzierzyn-Koźle
 2020/2021  Polish SuperCup, with ZAKSA Kędzierzyn-Koźle
 2020/2021  Polish Cup, with ZAKSA Kędzierzyn-Koźle
 2021/2022  Italian Cup, with Sir Safety Conad Perugia

Individual awards
 1997: CEV European Championship – Best Setter
 1997: Sportsman of The Year by the Olympic Committee of Serbia 
 2000: Italian Championship – Best Player
 2000: Italian Championship – Best Foreign Player
 2001: CEV European Championship – Best Setter
 2003: CEV European Championship – Best Setter
 2003: FIVB World Cup – Best Setter
 2005: CEV European Championship – Best Setter
 2006: CEV Top Teams Cup – Best Setter
 2009: FIVB World League – Best Setter
 2010: Italian Championship – Best Setter
 2010: Italian Cup – Best Player
 2010: CEV Cup – Best Setter
 2010: FIVB World Championship – Best Setter
 2014: CEV – Ultimate Team Leader

See also
 Matches of Serbian men's volleyball national team conducted by Nikola Grbić

References

External links

 
 Coach profile at LegaVolley.it 
 Coach/Player profile at Volleybox.net
 Player profile at LegaVolley.it   
 Player profile at Volleyhall.org
 
 
 

1973 births
Living people
Sportspeople from Zrenjanin
Yugoslav men's volleyball players
Serbia and Montenegro men's volleyball players
Serbian men's volleyball players
European champions for Serbia and Montenegro
Serbian volleyball coaches
Volleyball coaches of international teams
Olympic volleyball players of Yugoslavia
Olympic volleyball players of Serbia and Montenegro
Olympic volleyball players of Serbia
Olympic medalists in volleyball
Olympic gold medalists for Federal Republic of Yugoslavia
Olympic bronze medalists for Federal Republic of Yugoslavia
Volleyball players at the 1996 Summer Olympics
Medalists at the 1996 Summer Olympics
Volleyball players at the 2000 Summer Olympics
Medalists at the 2000 Summer Olympics
Volleyball players at the 2004 Summer Olympics
Volleyball players at the 2008 Summer Olympics
Serbian expatriate sportspeople in Italy
Expatriate volleyball players in Italy
Serbian expatriate sportspeople in Russia
Expatriate volleyball players in Russia
Serbian expatriate sportspeople in Poland
ZAKSA Kędzierzyn-Koźle coaches
Setters (volleyball)